Liver soup is a soup in Chinese cuisine that has been dated back to the Han Dynasty. It was a favorite food of many poor farmers in the region. It is popular in China, Singapore and Malaysia.

Liver soup is a very healthy food, packed with nutrition that gives people energy and keeps their bodies in tip-top shape. Some potential downsides are its high cholesterol and saturated fatcontent.

Preparation
Often using a pork liver, it is cut horizontally and vertically. Then, the bile or extra fats are carefully sliced away. Ginger is boiled and soy sauce is added. The liver is placed in the solution and left to cook for a while. Sesame oil and pepper are often used as condiments in this soup.

See also
 List of Chinese soups
 List of soups

References

Chinese soups